Ramón Moya Ribalta (born 2 March 1956) is a Spanish retired footballer who played as a defender, and is a current coach.

Managerial career
After a short spell as a footballer with UE Sant Andreu, Moya started his managerial career with RCD Espanyol's Juvenil team. In 1993, he was appointed CE L'Hospitalet manager, with the side in Segunda División B.

In April 1995 Moya was named at the helm of Gimnàstic de Tarragona, seriously threatened with relegation. After narrowly avoiding it, he left the club and subsequently returned to Hospi in the following year.

In the 1999 summer Moya was appointed manager of RCD Espanyol B, in Tercera División. In October 2002 he was named manager of the first team in La Liga, after Juande Ramos was suspended; his spell would only last two months, however.

In 2006, after another spell at Hospitalet, Moya was appointed at CE Sabadell FC. He brought the club back to Segunda División B in his first campaign, but was dismissed on 10 November 2009.

On 12 January 2014, after an unsuccessful spell at UDA Gramenet, Moya was named at the helm of CD Castellón. He left the post in May and immediately joined the club's board, but in October acted as an interim.

References

External links

1956 births
Living people
People from Pla d'Urgell
Sportspeople from the Province of Lleida
Spanish footballers
Footballers from Catalonia
Association football defenders
Segunda División players
Tercera División players
UE Sant Andreu footballers
CF Badalona players
Spanish football managers
La Liga managers
CE L'Hospitalet managers
RCD Espanyol B managers
Gimnàstic de Tarragona managers
RCD Espanyol managers
CE Sabadell FC managers
CD Castellón managers